The Line King: The Al Hirschfeld Story is a 1996 American documentary film directed by Susan Warms Dryfoos about the artist Al Hirschfeld. It was nominated for an Academy Award for Best Documentary Feature.  After its theatrical release, PBS broadcast the film in 1999 in a shortened version on American Masters.

References

External links

 Al Hirschfeld: The Line King at American Masters

1996 films
American documentary films
Documentary films about visual artists
1996 documentary films
1990s English-language films
1990s American films